Iglesia San Francisco de Valdivia is a church and convent in Valdivia, Chile. It was built between 1586 and 1628 and is the oldest building in the city, having withstood three major earthquakes. I

t is a national monument of Chile.

References

Buildings and structures in Valdivia
Roman Catholic churches completed in 1628
17th-century Roman Catholic church buildings
Religious buildings and structures completed in 1628